Trax! Box is a 2015 compilation box set by American rock band Ministry. It collects the band’s 1980-1985 output on the Wax Trax! label, including all remixes, side projects and period rarities. This collection builds greatly upon the 2004 RykoDisc re-issues and adds dozens of previously unreleased tracks.

The box set consists of 7 CDs, 1 live LP and a 64-page book. It was initially released for Record Store Day 2015 in edition of 2,000 copies, followed by a standard digital release.

Track listing

Notes:

 "I'm Falling" is the unreleased version that originally appeared on "Early Trax". This track, along with "Overkill" were test pressed by Wax Trax! in 1981 for a 7" entitled "Ministry of Fear" but remained unreleased until 2004.
 "Cold Life" is the short version that originally appeared on "Twelve Inch Singles 1981-1984"
 "Same Old Madness" is an earlier, entirely different version that has not yet appeared elsewhere. 
 "Where Are You At Now?" is an early mix of the "Nature of Love (Cruelty Mix)"

Notes:

 "Nature of Love (Cruelty Mix)" is the extended version from "Twelve Inch Singles 1981-1984"
 "All Day Remix" is the extended version from "Twelve Inch Singles 1981-1984"
 "I'm Falling (Alt Mix)" is incorrectly listed as previously unreleased. It is the same version that appears on the debut "I'm Falling/Cold Life" single.
 "Work For Love (Demo)" is identical to "Work For Love (Short Version)" that only appeared on the American and Italian pressings of the "Work For Love" 12" single.
 "Same Old Madness (Demo)" is the same version that appears on the Twelve Inch Singles 1981-1984 re-issue.

Notes:

 Some crowd noises between tracks have been edited.
 "Stainless Steel Providers" comes from the same Ministry show that was released as "In Case You Didn't Feel Like Showing Up" and "Live Necronomicon" (February 22, 1990 at the Holiday Star Theatre, Merrillville, Indiana)

Notes:

 "Get Down" is the short version that appeared on the LP and Cassette editions.
 "Public Image" comes from the same Ministry show that was released as "In Case You Didn't Feel Like Showing Up" and "Live Necronomicon" (February 22, 1990 at the Holiday Star Theatre, Merrillville, Indiana)

Notes:

 This is the first time these tracks have been made available digitally in their correct stereo format.
 "Show Me Your Spine" was originally featured in the 1987 film RoboCop, but did not receive a commercial release until being featured on Side Trax.

Notes:

 "We Shall Cleanse The World (Razormaid Mix)" is edited from its original release.

Notes:

 This live album was previously unreleased. It remained exclusive to this box set until it was released as part of the expanded Chicago/Detroit 1982 in 2019. Since the latter was released only on CD, however, the vinyl record contained in this set remains exclusive to it.

References

2014 compilation albums
Ministry (band) albums
Cleopatra Records compilation albums